Kyohei Iwasaki (岩崎 恭平, born April 4, 1986) is a Japanese professional baseball second baseman. Iwasaki played for  Chunichi Dragons in Japan's Nippon Professional Baseball in 2009, 2010, and 2013.

External links

1986 births
Living people
Baseball people from Kanagawa Prefecture
Japanese baseball players
Nippon Professional Baseball infielders
Chunichi Dragons players
Orix Buffaloes players